The Oklahoma Railway Museum is a 501(c)(3) tax exempt non-profit organization in Oklahoma City. It is self-funded through memberships, train fares, special events, donations, and grants for restoration projects. The growing membership, of approximately 210 members, has around 50 active members. Railroad operations are conducted under Federal Railroad Administration (FRA) rules, and the Museum is a member of the HeritageRail Alliance, Frontier Country Tourism, and an associate member of the Adventure District of Oklahoma City.

Operations

The museum operates four diesel locomotives and has a full assortment of railcars. Actual train rides are done every first and third Saturday of each month from April to September, typically at 9:15am, 11:15am, 1:15pm and 3:15pm.  Special annual events also occur, such as the Halloween Train, the  Easter Express, and the Polar Express around Christmastime.

Rolling stock
The museum has 10 diesel and steam locomotive engines, 10 passenger cars, numerous maintenance of way and freight equipment from many different roads.  Starting October 16, 2021, they have an operating "guest" steam engine "Sadie"  sn 4139  for the October train rides.  She was built in 1931 at the Vulcan Iron Works in Wilkes-Barre, PA.  It is slated to remain through the spring of 2022.

Events 
The Oklahoma Railway Museum hosts several events throughout the year. In addition to "Day Out With Thomas," they have a Halloween Train and Christmas Train. They have several venues to host birthday parties. Charter trains are also offered.

References

External links
 Oklahoma Railway Museum
 Sepulpa Daily Herald - August 20, 2007 - Train museum opens eyes to another era
 CNHI News Service – The Edmond Sun, September 25, 2006 – All aboard to the railway museum "...a group of dedicated volunteers who thought they could, and they did create an entertaining and educational museum honoring the state’s railroad history."
 Oklahoma Tourism & Recreation Department

Museums established in 2002
Railroad museums in Oklahoma
Heritage railroads in Oklahoma
Museums in Oklahoma City
2002 establishments in Oklahoma